Tankessé is a town in eastern Ivory Coast. It is a sub-prefecture of Koun-Fao Department in Gontougo Region, Zanzan District.

Tankessé was a commune until March 2012, when it became one of 1126 communes nationwide that were abolished.

In 2014, the population of the sub-prefecture of Tankessé was 25,378.

Villages
The twenty villages of the sub-prefecture of Tankessé and their population in 2014 are:

Notes

Sub-prefectures of Gontougo
Former communes of Ivory Coast